Tamati Gerald Coffey (born 19 September 1979) is a list Member of the New Zealand Parliament for the New Zealand Labour Party. Prior to entering Parliament, he was most notably an award-winning broadcaster fronting many shows over a decade, for Television New Zealand. He was also a successful small business hospitality owner in his hometown of Rotorua for 7 years, including during the COVID-19 pandemic, before selling in 2022. He is also a father, having had a baby through gestational surrogacy with his partner.

Early life
Born in Lower Hutt and educated at Onslow College, Coffey is of Ngāti Porou, Ngāti Awa, Ngāti Whakaue, Tūhourangi and Ngāti Tūwharetoa descent. He completed an honours degree in political science at the University of Auckland in 2003.

Television career

Seven Sharp 
Coffey was a fill-in presenter for current affairs programme Seven Sharp in late 2013 following Greg Boyed's departure from the show.

New Zealand's Got Talent 
Coffey was the host of New Zealand's Got Talent in 2012 and 2013.

Intrepid Journeys 
As part of series seven of the TVNZ show Intrepid Journeys, Coffey travelled to Oman on the Arabian Peninsula for three weeks. The episode screened on 20 January 2011 on TV One. Coffey is seen engaging in activities including mountain climbing, turtle nesting, dhow fishing cruises and souk shopping.

Breakfast 
In September 2007 Coffey left What Now and moved to TVNZ's early morning show Breakfast where he was the show's weatherman and roving reporter. He presented the show alongside Petra Bagust, Peter Williams, Rawdon Christie, Nadine Chalmers-Ross and Corin Dann. Coffey left Breakfast in December 2012 and was replaced in the role by Sam Wallace.

Dancing With the Stars 
Coffey was a contestant on season five of the New Zealand version of Dancing with the Stars in 2009. Partnered with Samantha Hitchcock, Coffey won the series final on 21 April 2009. Coffey's charity was Rainbow Youth, an organisation that supports gay youth.

What Now 
Coffey joined the What Now team in 2004. During his time on the show, Coffey also played character roles most notably, "Whitney" in the "What Now Cheerleaders" and "New Zild's Next Top Model". He mainly traveled around New Zealand in a car called "The Spyrider", to many different towns where weekly, he would film live with the locals and experience what their town had to offer. He hosted the show alongside co-hosts Virginie Le Brun, DJ Vinyl Richie, Serena Cooper and Charlie Panapa.

Political career

2014 election bid

On 29 March 2014, Coffey was selected as the Labour Party's candidate for the  electorate at the 2014 New Zealand general election. He was also placed 30th on the Labour list. He failed to unseat the incumbent National Party's Member of Parliament Todd McClay, and was not high enough on the list to get a seat in Parliament. During the campaign Coffey had been used for the Public Broadcasting of the Opening Addresses where he held a staged interview with David Cunliffe.

In 2016 he was selected as Labour's candidate for the Waiariki electorate, then held by Māori Party co-leader Te Ururoa Flavell. Coffey was ranked 35th on Labour's party list for the election.

Parliamentary service, 2017–present

During the 2017 New Zealand general election, Coffey won Waiariki for the Labour Party against incumbent Te Ururoa Flavell by a margin of 1,321 votes. With his win, Labour secured all 7 Māori electorates.

During the 2020 New Zealand general election held on 17 October, Coffey narrowly lost the Waiariki electorate to Māori Party candidate Rawiri Waititi based on preliminary results. Coffey did not concede until the release of the final results on 6 November. The final results confirmed that Coffey had lost to Waititi by a margin of 836 votes. Despite this loss, Coffey was re-elected to Parliament on the Labour Party list.

Rotorua Māori wards
In April 2022, Coffey introduced the Rotorua District Council (Representation Arrangements) Bill that sought to introduce three Māori wards to the Rotorua Lakes Council. Due to the Local Electoral Act 2001, the Council had not been able to establish a governing arrangement that would include adequate Māori representation without a law change. His Rotorua electoral bill passed its first reading on 6 April 2022 and was referred to the Māori Affairs Committee. While the Labour, Green and Māori parties supported the bill, the opposition National and ACT parties opposed it. 

In late April 2022, the Attorney General David Parker express concerned that the proposed Rotorua electoral bill discriminated against general roll voters by allocating more seats to Māori ward voters disproportionate to their share of the local population. At the time, Rotorua's general roll had 55,600 voters while its Māori roll had 21,700 voters. In response, Māori Development Minister Willie Jackson and Deputy Prime Minister Grant Robertson withdrew their support for Coffey's bill. The National Party's justice spokesperson Paul Goldsmith claimed that the bill breached the principle of "equal suffrage" by giving Maori electoral roll votes twice the value of general roll votes. By contrast, Māori Party co-leader Rawiri Waititi defended Coffey's Rotorua Bill, claiming that it accorded equal representation to Māori. In late April 2022, Coffey and the Rotorua Lakes Council agreed to "pause" the bill's select committee process in order to address the legal issues raised by the Attorney General.

Surrogacy reform and housing
As the father of surrogate children, Coffey took an interest in legislating for surrogacy reform. In 2021, his private member's bill, the Improvement Arrangements for Surrogacy Bill was introduced to Parliament. The Bill passed its first reading in May 2022. In October 2022, Coffey stated that he hoped that the surrogacy reform bill would pass into law before the end of the 53rd New Zealand Parliament. Coffey stated that "more and more couples are having kids this way, so the law needs to be changed to streamline this process."

Coffey also took an interest in housing in Rotorua and the Waiariki electorate. By March 2023, Coffey claimed credit for building 260 state homes, with 300 more on the way. He claimed that ghese measures reduced the number of people living in emergency housing by half compared with 2022. Former Mayor of Rotorua Steve Chadwick credited Coffey with securing NZ$300 million in funding from the Central Government for housing and regional development in the Rotorua disrict.

Retirement
On 10 March 2023, Coffey announced that he would not contest the 2023 New Zealand general election in order to spend more time with his two children. He also expressed hope that his law change for surrogacy reform would pass before the end of the 2020–2023 parliamentary term.

Business career
Following the 2014 election Coffey elected not to seek a new broadcasting role with TVNZ, instead going into business opening a bar in Rotorua with his partner Tim Smith. Their bar was designed to give Rotorua the atmosphere of Ponsonby, Auckland; the name of the bar being Ponsonby Road. It became a popular nightspot for several years.

In 2018, they bought a neighbouring restaurant and rebranded it as a Kiwi-style restaurant called Our House. Both restaurants became accredited living wage employers. In 2021, Ponsonby Rd closed and was rebranded as a cocktail and wine restaurant called Rotorua International but proved financially  unprofitable. Both Eat Street businesses were sold in December 2022.

Community service
In 2016, Coffey was elected to the Rotorua Energy Charitable Trust, winning the highest number of votes (5,125). By 2017, Coffey had become the Trust's Deputy Chair. In November 2022, Coffey lost his bid to be re-elected for a third term on the Rotorua Trust.

Personal life 
After winning Dancing With The Stars in 2009, Coffey came out as gay during an interview with Woman's Weekly and said that he lives with his long-term boyfriend, Tim Smith, a former music teacher from northern England. The couple announced their engagement on 16 February 2011 and wed in a civil union on 29 December 2011. His partner was hit by a falling ceiling fan in Christmas 2017.

In July 2019, they welcomed their first son Tūtānekai Smith-Coffey who was born via a surrogate. However the couple can't legally claim Tūtānekai is theirs until an adoption process is carried out between them and their surrogate mother.

In January 2023, the couple welcomed their second child and daughter Taitimu Smith-Coffey who was also born via surrogacy.

Filmography 
Sparkle Friends (2006–11)
What Now
Surprises!
2 Kids Own Awards
Whitebait-TV
Breakfast (weather presenter)
Intrepid Journeys
New Zealand's Got Talent
Neighbourhood
Moving Out With Tamati

References

1979 births
Living people
Dancing with the Stars (New Zealand TV series) winners
New Zealand television presenters
People educated at Onslow College
University of Auckland alumni
New Zealand Labour Party MPs
LGBT members of the Parliament of New Zealand
Gay politicians
People from Lower Hutt
Māori politicians
Ngāti Porou people
Ngāti Awa people
Tuhourangi people
Ngāti Whakaue people
Ngāti Tūwharetoa people
Unsuccessful candidates in the 2014 New Zealand general election
Candidates in the 2017 New Zealand general election
New Zealand MPs for Māori electorates
Candidates in the 2020 New Zealand general election